Aluf (Major General) Yusef Mishleb (sometimes spelled Yosef Mishlev) (born 1952) is a retired Druze general in the Israel Defense Forces serving last in the position as the Coordinator of Government Activities in the Territories. Mishleb retired in September 2008 after four years in the job and over 35 years in the Israel Defense Forces.

References

Living people
1952 births
Israeli generals
Israeli Druze